Diplopeltina is a genus of flies in the family Stratiomyidae.

Distribution
South Africa.

Species
Diplopeltina skaifei Lindner, 1972

References

Stratiomyidae
Brachycera genera
Taxa named by Erwin Lindner
Diptera of Africa
Endemic insects of South Africa